Pierre Barbotin (29 September 1926 – 19 February 2009) was a French racing cyclist, riding professionally from about 1948 to 1961.  He was born in Nantes and died in the same city.

Barbotin become known in 1951 when he finished second to Louison Bobet in the Milan–San Remo cycle race between Milan and Sanremo.  This race marked the beginning of the so-called "B-B" duo - that is, a Bobet-Barbotin partnership where Barbotin became one of the principal teammates of Bobet, especially as part of the Tour de France. Barbotin rode for various teams, including Stella Dunlop (1948–50), Bottechia (1951–52), Stella Wolber Dunlop (1953), Royal-Codrix (1954), Saint Raphael (1955–57), Margnat-Coupry (1959), and Bobet BP Hutchinson (1958, 1960). Barbotin won 13 victories in his career.

Racing career

During his first season as a professional, Barbotin won third place in the Dijon-Lyon race in 1948.  The following year he won the team grand prize (Grand Prix de l'Équipe) with André Mahé and Marcel Dussault, and he placed second in the French bike race Manche-Ocean behind Joseph Morvan. In 1950, Barbotin enjoyed one of his greatest victories by winning the Critérium National de la Route, a two-day bicycle stage race held in France every spring. The same year, he finished second in the race for the Grand Prize of Switzerland.  In the 1951 Tour de France, Barbotin placed sixth in the final general classification.

Victories

Below is a list of Barbotin's racing victories between 1949 and 1957:

1949
Grand Prix de l'Equipe (team award with André Mahé et Marcel Dussault)

1950
Critérium International
Premier Elan Parisien
Grand Prix des cycles Robert
Hennebont

1951
Circuit de l'Indre
Paris-Côte d'Azur, stage 3

1954
Tour du Sud-Est, stage 6

1955
L'Etoile du Léon (referred to as "critérium du Léon" in 1955 and taking place at Cléder)
Pontivy

1956
Critérium du Dauphiné Libéré, stage 7(a)

1957
Châteaugiron
Grand Prix de Nantes in 1960

Other important results

Below are some other important results from Barbotin's cycling career, even though they may not have been first-place finishes:

1948
2nd place: Grand Prix du Libre-Poitou
3rd place: Dijon-Lyon
6th place: Grand Prix des Nations

1949
2nd place: Manche-Océan
3rd place: Grand Prix de Redon
5th place: Grand Prix des Nations
5th place: Grand Prix de Suisse

1950
2nd place: Grand Prix de Suisse
2nd place: Grand Prix du Pneumatique
3rd place: Saint-Méen le Grand

1951
2nd place: Championnat de France
2nd place: Milan–San Remo
2nd place: Critérium National
5th place: Paris-Côte d'Azur
6th place: Tour de France (2nd and 3rd stages)

1952
7th place: Paris-Côte d'Azur

1953
4th place: La Haye-Pesnel

1954
3rd place: Paris-Valenciennes

1956
2nd place: Critérium de Quillan
2nd place: Paris-Nice (2è d'étape)
2nd place: Felletin
7th place: Critérium du Dauphiné Libéré
8th place: Critérium National

1957
3rd place: Tour de l'Ouest
3rd place: Tour de Normandie
3rd place: Saint-Claud
4th place: Manche-Océan

1958
3rd place: Clohars-Carnoet
7th place: Manche-Océan

1959
3rd place: Bannalec
10th place: Boucles de la Seine in 1959

Teams

Barbotin participated on the following teams:
1948: Stella - Dunlop (France)
1949: Stella - Dunlop (France)
1950: Stella - Dunlop (France)
1951: Bottecchia-Ursus (Italie)
1951: Stella - Dunlop (France)
1952: Stella - Huret (France)
1952: Bottecchia (Italie)
1953: Stella - Wolber - Dunlop (France)
1954: Royal Codrix (France)
1954: Stella - Wolber - Dunlop (France)
1955: Saint-Raphael - R. Geminiani (France)
1956: Saint-Raphael - R. Geminiani (France)
1957: Saint-Raphael - R. Geminiani (France)
1957: Velo Club Bustese (Italie) du 18-05 au 09-06
1958: L. Bobet - BP - Hutchinson (France)
1959: Urago - d'Alessandro (France)
1959: Bobet - BP - Hutchinson (France)
1960: L. Bobet - BP - Hutchinson (France)

Later life

After finishing his career as a professional cyclist in 1961, Barbotin became a sales director of the regional newspaper Presse-Océan.

References

1926 births
2009 deaths
French male cyclists
Cyclists from Nantes